Thiocarbohydrazide is a toxic compound made by the reaction of carbon disulfide with hydrazine (hydrazinolysis). It is used in the silver proteinate specific staining of carbohydrates in electron microscopy.

References

Hydrazides
Thioureas